"That's Nasty" is a song by American rapper Pitbull featuring Lil Jon, Fat Joe and Lil Scrappy. It was released on October 27, 2004 as the second single from Pitbull's first studio album M.I.A.M.I.. The song was produced by Lil Jon.

Release history

References

2004 singles
2004 songs
Pitbull (rapper) songs
Fat Joe songs
Lil Jon songs
TVT Records singles
Dirty rap songs
Songs written by Pitbull (rapper)
Songs written by Lil Jon
Songs written by Fat Joe
Crunk songs